The Mapleton Local School District is a public school district in Ashland County, Ohio, United States, located in Orange Township, Ashland County, Ohio.

Schools

The Mapleton Local School District has one elementary school, one middle school, and one high school.

Elementary school
Mapleton Elementary School

Middle school
Mapleton Middle School

High school
Mapleton High School

References

External links

Ashland City School District
School districts in Ohio